Nam Gye-u (1811–1888) was a Korean painter and a government officer in the late Joseon period. 
Nam Gyewu was born to a high class and son of Nam Jinhwa who served as Busa. He lived in Namchon, Seoul and had an official career as Dojeong. Nam was especially good at depicting butterflies, so called as Nam Nabi (Butterfly Nam), his nickname. Through his lifetime, Nam Gye-u devoted to drawing pictures of butterflies and flowers.

Gallery

See also
Korean painting
List of Korean painters
Korean art
Korean culture

External links

Brief biography (in Korean)
Brief biography(in Korean)

1811 births
1888 deaths
19th-century Korean painters